Malveaux may refer to:

 Julianne Malveaux (born 1953), college president and economist
 Kelly Malveaux (born 1976), football player
 Suzanne Malveaux (born 1966), journalist
 Suzette M. Malveaux (born 1966), lawyer and law professor

See also:

 Lee Boyd Malvo, convicted murderer (also known as John Lee Malvo) connected with the Beltway sniper attacks in the Washington Metropolitan Area over a 3-week period in October 2002. 

 Lorne Malvo, a fictional character (portrayed by Billy Bob Thornton) and the primary antagonist of Season 1 of the FX television series Fargo